Ben Sorensen's Real Country was a syndicated Australian country music radio show and podcast. The weekly, hour-long show is hosted by Ben Sorensen. The radio programme was originally broadcast by 4GY based in Gympie, Queensland and from 2011 it has been syndicated to over 100 radio stations across Australia; along with a number in New Zealand, the United States, and United Kingdom. In January 2014 it was broadcast from the Tamworth Country Music Festival for a fortnight.

Sorensen also broadcast Ben Sorensen's Druids Garden.

Ben Sorensen's REAL Country was distributed to radio stations by syndication and is also available as a podcast.

References

External links

Ben Sorensen's REAL Country Website
Ben Sorensen's REAL Country Podcast

Australian country music radio programs
2000s Australian radio programs